Salona Kushwaha is an Indian politician and a member of the Eighteenth Legislative Assembly of Uttar Pradesh in India. She represents the Tilhar constituency of Uttar Pradesh and is a member of the Bharatiya Janata Party.

Early life and education 
Salona Kushwaha was born in Nigohi, Tilhar         She graduated with her MA from Mahatma Jyotiba Phule Rohilkhand University (MA). She married renowned Neuro physician Dr. Ram Singh Kushwaha.

Social work 
The Women's Polytechnic College, Village Jahanpur of Tilhar was inaugurated by MLA Salona Kushwaha, and since then on the demand of the local girls. On 14 September 2022, the water tank in the arrangement of pure drinking water was made. The electric bus service from Shahjahanpur to Polytechnic College Jahanpur Tilhar for the movement of the girl students started and made an easy way for the convenience of the girl students.

Constantly absorbed in public service, on 14 September gave a unique gift to the Nagar Panchayat Nigohi providing Street lights, and a Sky lift machine.

Controversies 
Barring an incident in Shahjahanpur where violence erupted between BJP workers and the local police after the former alleged that cops took money to "support the Samajwadi Party candidate" in Nigohi, which falls under the Tilhar constituency. BJP nominee Salona Kushwaha complained of "police's inaction against fake votes". The incident was reported right after polling was over and hundreds of BJP workers gathered outside the police station. Eyewitnesses said cops had to resort to mild force to bring the situation under control.Toi

References 

 Live telecast of swearing-in ceremony of UP Vidhan Sabha । विधानसभा के शपथ ग्रहण समारोह का प्रसारण
 सलोना कुशवाहा सपा छोड़ भाजपा में शामिल, बोलीं-वहां महिलाओं की कोई कद्र नहीं है
 BJP के बाद अब सपा से नेताओं का जाना शुरू, वर्तमान विधायक और पूर्व मंत्री ने भी पार्टी छोड़ी
 तिलहर से सलोना बनी भाजपा प्रत्याशी:तिलहर से भाजपा ने सपा छोड़ भाजपा का दमन थामने वाली सलोना कुशवाहा को बनाया प्रत्याशी
 UP Election 2022: महिला हूं अबला ना समझें दबंग, बीजेपी प्रत्याशी Salona Kushwaha की हुंकार
 60% turnout in 55 UP seats in 2nd phase of elections
 UP Chunav 2022: सपा को एक और बड़ा झटका, घोषित प्रत्याशी सलोना कुशवाहा बीजेपी में हुईं शामिल
 जनता पर मुझे पूर्ण विश्वास है, विधायक होने के बाद जनता के विश्वास को हम टूटने नहीं देंगे- सलोंना कुशवाहा

Indian women in politics
Living people
Uttar Pradesh MLAs 2022–2027
Bharatiya Janata Party politicians from Uttar Pradesh
1974 births
21st-century Indian women politicians